Gi-Fi or gigabit wireless refers to a wireless communication at a data rate of more than one billion bits (gigabit) per second.

By 2004 some trade press used the term "Gi-Fi" to refer to faster versions of the IEEE 802.11 standards marketed under the trademark Wi-Fi.

In 2008 researchers at the University of Melbourne demonstrated a transceiver integrated on a single integrated circuit (chip) that operated at 60 GHz on the CMOS process. It will allow wireless transfer of audio and video data at up to 5 gigabits per second, ten times the current maximum wireless transfer rate, at one-tenth the cost. Researchers chose the 57–64 GHz unlicensed frequency band since the millimetre-wave range of the spectrum allowed high component on-chip integration as well as the integration of very small high gain arrays. The available 7 GHz of spectrum results in very high data rates, up to 5 gigabits per second to users within an indoor environment, usually within a range of 10 metres.
Some press reports called this "GiFi".
It was developed by Melbourne University-based laboratories of NICTA (National ICT Australia Limited), Australia’s Information and Communications Technology Research Centre of Excellence.

In 2009, the Wireless Gigabit Alliance was formed to promote the technology. It used the term "WiGig" which avoided trademark confusion.

References 

Computer networking